Mystery of the Desert Giant is Volume 40 in the original The Hardy Boys Mystery Stories published by Grosset & Dunlap.

This book was written for the Stratemeyer Syndicate by James Buechler in 1961.

Plot summary

Much of this book takes place in Blythe, California and it cites real, current locales, such as Hobson Way and the giant intaglios north of Blythe on U.S. Highway 95.   In the end, the boys discover that Grafton's fellow explorer had a part in the gang of criminal's racket. With this, Grafton is rescued, and the thugs who apparently were smuggling illegal checks across the border are caught.

References

The Hardy Boys books
1960 American novels
1960 children's books
Blythe, California
Novels set in California
Grosset & Dunlap books